Wilson Island is an island of the Andaman Islands. It belongs to the South Andaman administrative district, part of the Indian union territory of the Andaman and Nicobar Islands.

Etymology
Wilson Island is named after Brigadier Commander Sir Archdale Wilson.

History
There is a lighthouse on the island. It was commissioned on 23 March 1994.

Geography
The island belongs to the Ritchie's Archipelago and is located between Nicholson Island and John Lawrence Island. a narrow channel separates it from Sir William Peel Island to the south.

Administration
Politically, Wilson Island is part of Port Blair taluk.

Demographics 
The island is uninhabited.

Image gallery

References 

Ritchie's Archipelago
Islands of South Andaman district
Islands of the Andaman Sea
Uninhabited islands of India
Islands of India
Islands of the Bay of Bengal